Dinas, officially the Municipality of Dinas (Subanen: Benwa Dinas; Chavacano: Municipalidad de Dinas), is a 4th class municipality in the province of Zamboanga del Sur, Philippines. According to the 2020 census, it has a population of 36,291 people.

History
Several theories have been woven and advanced to explain the origin of the now famous municipality of Dinas, which had been the cradle of Islamic Culture and civilization and the bulwark of anti-Hispanic colonization of the entire Baganian Peninsula in Zamboanga del Sur.

According to ancient history which has been accepted and educated by the scions of the great grand Sultan Kudarat, a descendants of the renowned Shariff Kabungsuan of Maguindanao was that the name Dinas was taken from a Maguindanao tern Di Nas where "Di" means "Not" and "Nas" means "Bad Luck or Unlucky".

Hence, the early settlers who migrated from the province of Cotabato found their new haven as not unlucky or "Di Nas" because the mouths of all rivers emptying into the coastlines are facing East which according to their belief is a sign of good luck.

The most popular legend handed down to this generation is that Dinas got its name by coincidence as a result of communication gap between a native and foreigner.

When the Spaniards came to our shores, there was already a little settlement in Dinas organized by the followers of Shariff Kabungsuan. Within the community, there was only one sari-sari store wherein household necessities being supplied by the Chinese traders, who frequently visited the place from Zamboanga City.

One day, a group of Spaniards happened to visit the place as part of their Christianization campaign. They roamed around until they reached the only store within the settlement. They asked what the name of the place was. The store owner did not understand a single word from the Spaniards. He thought that the Spaniards were asking what he was selling because they were pointing at the piles of sardines inside the shelves. Immediately, the store owner replied, "Sardinas", the native word of sardines. The foreigner nodded convincingly, "Ah, Dinas" and the Spaniards thought that the name of the place is Dinas. This is how Dinas got its name.

Geography

Barangays
Dinas is politically subdivided into 30 barangays.

Climate

Demographics

Economy

References

External links
 Dinas Profile at PhilAtlas.com
 [ Philippine Standard Geographic Code]
Philippine Census Information

Municipalities of Zamboanga del Sur